James Clay Jones III (born August 9, 1982), better known by his stage name Boldy James, is an American rapper from Detroit, Michigan. A member of the Griselda collective, his debut album, My 1st Chemistry Set, was released on October 15, 2013.

Early life
Boldy James was born James Clay Jones III on August 9, 1982, in Atlanta, Georgia to James Clay Jones Jr. and Toni K. Broadus. In 1983, Jones and Broadus returned to their original home of Detroit, Michigan with their son after Jones was wounded in the line of duty serving as a police officer. They resided on the Eastside of Detroit with James' grandmother. In 1989, James' parents separated and his mother sent him and his younger sister to live with their father on Detroit's westside on Stahelin Hell Block near McNichols Road and the Southfield Freeway. James' love for music came to the forefront at the age of 12, when he performed in a middle school talent show and began writing his first raps shortly after. He attended high school at Detroit Cooley, and dropped out after the ninth grade. He got the name Boldy James from his friend from his block, James Osely III, who people in the neighborhood called Boldy. Boldy said "he didn't rap, he just sold cocaine. I liked the name because his name was James too". When his friend was murdered, he decided to carry on with the name, using it to rap.

Career
In 2009, Boldy James's first big break on the national scene came in the form of two features on The Cool Kids and Don Cannon's mixtape Merry Christmas, on the songs "BBQ Wings" and "Tires". That was followed up by his record "Gettin Flicked" appearing on The Cool Kids's 2010 mixtape Tacklebox. Also in 2010, he was featured on the Chip tha Ripper song "Fat Raps" remix alongside Big Sean, Asher Roth, Dom Kennedy and Chuck Inglish. Boldy James and Cool Kid member/producer Chuck Inglish are cousins. On May 24, 2011, Boldy James released his solo debut mixtape Trappers Alley Pros and Cons. The project went on to be named by Pitchfork as one of 2011's Most Overlooked Projects. On February 27, 2012, he released his follow up mixtape, Consignment. On March 5, 2013, he released an EP titled Grand Quarters. On October 15, 2013, he released his debut album, My 1st Chemistry Set, entirely produced by The Alchemist. On May 22, 2014, it was announced that Boldy James, Bishop Nehru, and Fashawn were the first signees to Nas's Mass Appeal Records.

Personal life 
On January 9, 2023, Jones was involved in a car accident in Detroit, leaving him with a broken vertebrae requiring intensive surgery.

Discography

Studio albums

Extended plays

Mixtapes

Singles

As featured artist

Guest appearances

References

1982 births
African-American male rappers
American male rappers
Living people
Midwest hip hop musicians
Rappers from Atlanta
Rappers from Detroit
21st-century American rappers
21st-century American male musicians
21st-century African-American musicians
20th-century African-American people